The Bras à Pierre is a tributary of the Saint-Jean river, flowing in the municipality of L'Anse-Saint-Jean, in the Le Fjord-du-Saguenay Regional County Municipality, in the administrative region of Saguenay–Lac-Saint-Jean, in the province from Quebec, to Canada.

The valley of "Bras à Pierre" (English: Pierre's arm) is served by the Périgny road for forestry, agriculture and recreational tourism activities. Some secondary forest roads serve this valley.

Forestry is the main economic activity in the sector; recreational tourism activities, second; agriculture in third. This valley contains some dwellings distributed in small deforested areas.

The surface of "Bras à Pierre" is usually frozen from the beginning of December to the end of March, however the safe circulation on the ice is generally done from mid-December to mid-March.

Geography 
The main watersheds neighboring the "Bras à Pierre" are:
 north side: Saint-Jean River, Emmuraillé Lake, Éternité River, Saguenay River;
 east side: Patrice-Fortin stream, Portage River, Petit Saguenay River, ruisseau de la sucrerie (sugar mill stream), Saint Lawrence River;
 south side: Bazile lake, Chouinard stream, Malbaie River, Noire River, "lac de la Hauteur" (Height lake);
 west side: Saint-Jean River, Rivière à la Catin, Brébeuf Lake, Cami River, Ha! Ha! River.

The "Bras à Pierre" originates in the marsh area) between the mountains in the northern part of the Rivière à la Catin. This marsh area is fed by a few mountain streams. This source of the watercourse is located at:
  north of the course of the Rivière à la Catin;
  north of the hamlet "Le Bras-du-Suroît";
  west of a mountain peak reaching ;
  north-west of a mountain peak reaching ;
  south of the confluence of the "Bras à Pierre" and the Saint-Jean River.

  towards the north especially in the marsh area in a valley in a valley surrounded by high mountains, collecting the discharge (coming from the west) of a small lake, as well as the discharge (from the east) from another small lake, to a stream (from the east);
  westward, to a stream (coming from the west);
  towards the north in a valley between the mountains and forming a hook towards the west and a loop towards the east at the end of the segment, up to the mouth.

Pierre's arm spills out onto the south bank of the Saint-Jean River. This mouth is located at:
  south-west of the hamlet "La Vallée-d'Amont";
  east of Brébeuf Lake;
  south-east of the village center of Rivière-Éternité;
  south of the confluence of the Éternité River and the Éternité Bay (Saguenay River);
  south-west of the confluence of the Saint-Jean River and Anse Saint-Jean (Saguenay River).

From the confluence of "Bras à Pierre", the current:
 follows the course of the Saint-Jean River on  generally towards the northeast;
 follows the course of the Saguenay River on  eastward to Tadoussac where it merges with the Estuary of Saint Lawrence.

Toponymy 
The term "Pierre" is a male given name.

The toponym "Bras à Pierre" was formalized on December 5, 1968, by the Commission de toponymie du Québec.

See also

 Le Fjord-du-Saguenay Regional County Municipality
 L'Anse-Saint-Jean
 Saint-Jean River
 Saguenay River
 List of rivers of Quebec

References

External links 

Rivers of Saguenay–Lac-Saint-Jean
Le Fjord-du-Saguenay Regional County Municipality